Mykolaiv Oblast, also referred to as Mykolayivshchyna, is an oblast (province) of Ukraine. The administrative center of the oblast is the city of Mykolaiv. At the most recent estimate, the population of the oblast stood at

History

During the 2022 Russian invasion of Ukraine, the Russian army invaded the province from Kherson Oblast, attacking as far northwest as Voznesensk. They were repulsed at Voznesensk, and their attempt to take Mykolaiv failed. From April 2022, almost all of the province was under Ukrainian control, apart from the extreme south-east and the Kinburn peninsula. When Russia annexed Kherson Oblast in September 2022, it incorporated the occupied areas of Mykolaiv Oblast.  A Ukrainian military official announced a Russian withdrawal from Mykolaiv Oblast on 10 November 2022.

On 4–5 July 2022 during an international Ukraine Recovery Conference (URC 2022) in Lugano, Switzerland pledged to support the rebuilding of Mykolaiv region.

Geography

The Mykolaiv Oblast is located in the southern half of Ukraine. Its area (24,600 km²) comprises about 4.07% of the total area of Ukraine.

The Mykolaiv Oblast borders upon the Odesa Oblast in the west-southwest, the Kirovohrad Oblast in the north, the Dnipropetrovsk Oblast in the northeast, and the Kherson Oblast on the southeast.

To the south, the oblast is also bordered by the Black Sea. To Mykolaiv Oblast belong Kinburn Peninsula, Berezan Island in Black Sea, Pervomaisky Island in Dnieper Estuary.

In regards to relief, Mykolaiv Oblast is a plain that gently slopes in southern direction. Bigger portion of the territory lays within Black Sea Lowland. To the north there are spurs of Podolian and Dnieper uplands. Among major valuable deposits and minerals there are nickel, uranium ores, granite, gneiss, quartzites.

The climate is moderately continental with a mild winter of small snow amount and hot arid summer.

In the territory of the region are eighty-five rivers that belong to basin of the Black Sea. Among main rivers there are the Southern Bug (Boh) which splits the oblast into eastern and western parts, Inhulets, and Berezan.

Points of interest
The following historic-cultural sites were nominated for the Seven Wonders of Ukraine or Seven Natural Wonders of Ukraine.
 Olbia, an ancient ruins of Greek colony near Ochakiv
 Black Sea Biosphere Reserve, located near Kinburn peninsula
 Granite-steppe lands of Buh, a landscape park located up north towards Podolia
 Inhul River Park, a landscape park in eastern part of the region
 Tylihul landscape park, on the administrative border with Odesa Oblast
 Dykyi Sad archaeological site (Wild Garden) in the city of Mykolaiv

Demographics

The estimated population was 1.2 million people in 2005. The greater part of the oblast's population resided in urban type settlements (66%), with the remainder residing in agricultural areas. Also, almost 60% of the urban population resided in Mykolayiv, the industrial, cultural and administrative center of Mykolayiv Oblast.

As of 2021, the total population of the oblast was estimated at 1,108,394 inhabitants, with 761,278 (68.7%) residing in urban areas and the remaining 347,116 (31.3%) living in rural areas. The city of Mykolayiv, home to 476,101 residents, constituted 62.5% of the urban population of Mykolayiv Oblast.

The oblast's population density is one of the lowest in Ukraine – . Mykolaiv Oblast contains 2.7% of the population of Ukraine, by percentage share ranking 19th among Ukrainian oblasts and territories.

Age structure
 0-14 years: 14.7%  (male 88,668/female 83,434)
 15-64 years: 70.7%  (male 396,342/female 432,808)
 65 years and over: 14.6%  (male 56,527/female 114,987) (2013 official)

Median age
 total: 39.7 years 
 male: 36.3 years 
 female: 42.9 years  (2013 official)

Ethnicity, language and citizenship 
The oblast has a multi-ethnic composition; people of more than 100 ethnicities (national groups) live in the oblast.  The most common language in the oblast is Ukrainian; the second most common language is Russian.  In the city of Mykolaiv the most common language is Russian.

At the time of the 2001 census, the oblast had 1,269,900 permanent residents.  Of these:
1,251,100 (99.1%) had Ukrainian citizenship.
6,400 had citizenship of CIS countries.
10,200 had citizenship of other countries.
4,200 were without citizenship.
1,000 who did not specify their citizenship.

Administrative divisions

Mykolaiv Oblast formed in September 1937. it is subdivided into various areas, mostly raions. The subdivisions changed in 2020.

Administrative divisions (18 July 2020 to present)

On 18 July 2020, the number of Mykolaiv Oblast subdivisions was reduced to four raions. These are:
 Bashtanka (Баштанський район), the center is in the town of Bashtanka; 
 Mykolaiv (Миколаївський район), the center is in the city of Mykolaiv;
 Pervomaisk (Первомайський район), the center is in the town of Pervomaisk;
 Voznesensk (Вознесенський район), the center is in the town of Voznesensk.

Administrative divisions (to 17 July 2020)

Before July 2020, Mykolaiv Oblast was subdivided into 24 regions: 19 raions (administrative districts) and 5 city municipalities (mis'krada or misto), officially known as territories governed by city councils which are directly subordinate to the oblast government.

Note: Asterisks (*) Though the administrative center of the rayon is housed in the city/town that it is named after, cities do not answer to the rayon authorities only towns do; instead they are directly subordinated to the oblast government and therefore are not counted as part of rayon statistics.

At a lower level of administration, these district-level administrations are subdivided into:

 Settlements — 922, including:
 Villages — 896;
 Cities/Towns — 21, including:
 Cities of raion subordinance — 4 (Bashtanka, Novyi Buh, Nova Odesa and Snihurivka);
 Urban-type settlement — 17;
 Selsovets — 287.

The local administration of the oblast is controlled by the Mykolaiv Oblast Rada. The governor of the oblast is the Mykolaiv Oblast Rada speaker, appointed by the President of Ukraine.

Infrastructure and economy
 Along the coast, there are several ports and the Mykolaiv International Airport.
 The region's railway network and infrastructure is part of the Odesa Railways.
 Through the region passes European route E58 and European route E95.
 The city of Mykolaiv is known for several of its shipyards that existed since the 19th century.
 South Ukraine Nuclear Power Plant
 Agrarian company Nibulon
 Mykolaiv Observatory

Public opinion
During the 1991 referendum, 89.45% of votes in Mykolaiv Oblast were in favor of the Declaration of Independence of Ukraine. A survey conducted in December 2014 by the Kiev International Institute of Sociology found 2.1% of the oblast's population supported their region joining Russia, 95.5% did not support the idea, and the rest were undecided or did not respond.

See also
 Subdivisions of Ukraine
 Kherson Governorate
 Lysa Hora

References

External links
 State Administration of Mykolaiv Oblast - official site  
 Information Card of the Region - official site of the Cabinet of Ministers of Ukraine

 
Oblasts of Ukraine
States and territories established in 1937
1937 establishments in Ukraine